Arecatannin B1 is a B type proanthocyanidin found in the betel nut. It is an arecatannin trimer with a 4β→6 bond.

References

External links 
 Arecatannin B1 on http://herbdb.koushi.pref.okinawa.jp (Japanese)

Procyanidins
Natural phenol trimers